Joseph Evans Brown (July 28, 1891 – July 6, 1973) was an American actor and comedian, remembered for his friendly screen persona, comic timing, and enormous elastic-mouth smile. He was one of the most popular American comedians in the 1930s and 1940s, with films like A Midsummer Night's Dream (1935), Earthworm Tractors (1936), and Alibi Ike (1935). In his later career Brown starred in Some Like It Hot (1959), as Osgood Fielding III, in which he utters the film's famous punchline "Well, nobody's perfect."

Early life
Brown was born on July 28, 1891, in Holgate, Ohio, near Toledo, into a large family of Welsh descent. He spent most of his childhood in Toledo. In 1902, at the age of ten, he joined a troupe of circus tumblers known as the Five Marvelous Ashtons, who toured the country on both the circus and vaudeville circuits. Later he became a professional baseball player. Despite his skill, he declined an opportunity to sign with the New York Yankees to pursue his career as an entertainer. After three seasons he returned to the circus, then went into vaudeville and finally starred on Broadway. He gradually added comedy to his act, and transformed himself into a comedian. He moved to Broadway in the 1920s, first appearing in the musical comedy Jim Jam Jems.

Film career

In late 1928, Brown began making films, starting the next year with Warner Bros. He quickly became a favorite with child audiences, and shot to stardom after appearing in the first all-color all-talking musical comedy On with the Show (1929). He starred in a number of lavish Technicolor musical comedies, including Sally (1929), Hold Everything (1930), Song of the West (1930), and Going Wild (1930). By 1931, Brown had become such a star that his name was billed above the title in the films in which he appeared.

He appeared in Fireman, Save My Child (1932), a comedy in which he played a member of the St. Louis Cardinals, and in Elmer, the Great (1933) with Patricia Ellis and Claire Dodd and Alibi Ike (1935) with Olivia de Havilland, in both of which he portrayed ballplayers with the Chicago Cubs.

In 1933 he starred in Son of a Sailor with Jean Muir and Thelma Todd. In 1934, Brown starred in A Very Honorable Guy with Alice White and Robert Barrat, in The Circus Clown again with Patricia Ellis and with Dorothy Burgess, and with Maxine Doyle in 6 Day Bike Rider.

Brown was one of the few vaudeville comedians to appear in a Shakespearean film; he played Francis Flute in the Max Reinhardt/William Dieterle film version of Shakespeare's A Midsummer Night's Dream (1935) and was highly praised for his performance. 

In 1933 and 1936, he was named one of the top 10 earners in films. He starred in Polo Joe (1936) with Carol Hughes and Richard "Skeets" Gallagher, and in Sons o' Guns. 

By the mid-1930s Joe E. Brown's films were established as dependable moneymakers, and the studio had begun to economize on their production. When his Warner contract expired, Brown did not renew it. He left Warner Bros. to work for independent producer David L. Loew, starring in a series of comedies including When's Your Birthday? (1937) and The Gladiator (1938), a loose adaptation of Philip Gordon Wylie's 1930 novel Gladiator that influenced the creation of Superman. 

Joe E. Brown left Loew in 1939. While his brand of broad comedy was still popular, it was somewhat old-fashioned, much like the slapstick efforts of Laurel and Hardy. As a result, Brown was now being handed "B" pictures for Paramount (one film), Columbia (three films), and finally Republic (four films). The Republics were his last starring vehicles. From this point on, Brown continued in films but in guest appearances and character roles.

Radio and television announcing

Brown has a place in Boston's sports history. On April 14, 1925, radio station WBZ (AM) broadcast a local Major League baseball game for the first time. The Boston Braves played against the New York Giants, a game that the Braves won 5–4. The radio announcer for that day was Joe E. Brown. Brown was a devoted baseball fan, and some sportswriters who had seen him when he was a semi-pro player still believed he could have become a successful major league player one day. In April 1925, he was in the Boston area, starring in a stage performance of "Betty Lee" at Boston's Majestic Theater. Brown knew several of the Boston sportswriters, especially sports cartoonist Abe Savrann ("SAV") of the Boston Traveler. Brown was a member of the Benevolent and Protective Order of Elks, and so was Savrann, who brought him in as a guest speaker at the mid-April 1925 meeting of the Cambridge, Massachusetts Elks Lodge.  Savrann noted in his Traveler cartoon on April 15, 1925 (p. 20) that Brown had been the game announcer that day. And the radio critic for the New Britain (CT) Daily Herald wrote that "It is too bad that Joe E. Brown, who announced the game yesterday, could not fill that place during the entire season," noting that Brown not only described the game well but also offered amusing and interesting anecdotes in the process. While there is no information that he did any further radio play-by-play announcing, he did return to the broadcast booth in television, in 1953. He served as a commentator for the New York Yankees games on WPIX-TV. His TV duties included a 15-minute pre-game show and a 10-minute post-game show throughout the season. At the end of the season, he was replaced by Red Barber.

World War II

In 1939, Brown testified before the House Immigration Committee in support of a bill that would allow 20,000 German-Jewish refugee children into the U.S.  He later adopted two refugee children.

At age 50 when the U.S. entered World War II, Brown was too old to enlist. Both of his biological sons served in the military during the war. In 1942, Captain Don E. Brown, was killed when his Douglas A-20 Havoc crashed near Palm Springs, California.

Even before the USO was organized, Brown spent a great deal of time traveling, at his own expense, to entertain troops in the South Pacific, including Guadalcanal, New Zealand and Australia, as well as the Caribbean and Alaska. He was the first to tour in this way and before Bob Hope made similar journeys. Brown also spent many nights working and meeting servicemen at the Hollywood Canteen. He wrote of his experiences entertaining the troops in his book Your Kids and Mine.  On his return to the U.S., Brown brought sacks of letters, making sure they were delivered by the Post Office. He gave shows in all weather conditions, many in hospitals, sometimes doing his entire show for a single dying soldier. He signed autographs for everyone. For his services to morale, Brown became one of only two civilians to be awarded the Bronze Star during World War II.

Postwar work
His concern for the troops continued into the Korean War, as evidenced by a newsreel featuring his appeal for blood donations to aid the U.S. and UN troops there that was featured in the season 4 episode of M*A*S*H titled "Deluge".

Brown became known for touring in the role of Elwood P. Dowd, the lead in Mary Chase's Harvey:The comic said that sometime during the run of Harvey at Elitch, he’ll have invoked the character of the lovable Elwood for the 2,000th time. This means that he’ll have played the part more than any other living person as well as performed it in more countries than anyone. “I’ve performed it in Australia, Canada, England and Hawaii,” said Brown. “I took over the part in the New York company when Frank Fay, the originator, gave it up, and played it seven months before it went on the road.In 1948, he was awarded a Special Tony Award for his work in the touring company of Harvey.

In 1954, Brown appeared in Milestones of Motoring, a made-for-television industrial musical produced by Cinécraft Productions, with Merv Griffin and Rita Farrell.

He had a cameo in Around the World in 80 Days (1956), as the Fort Kearney stationmaster talking to Fogg (David Niven) and his entourage in a small town in Nebraska. In the similarly epic film It's a Mad, Mad, Mad, Mad World (1963), he had a cameo as a union official giving a speech at a construction site in the climactic scene. On television, he was the mystery guest on What's My Line? during the episode on January 11, 1953.

His best known postwar role was that of aging millionaire Osgood Fielding III in Billy Wilder's 1959 comedy Some Like It Hot. Fielding falls for Daphne (Jerry), played by Jack Lemmon in drag; at the end of the film, Lemmon takes off his wig and reveals to Brown that he is a man, to which Brown responds "Well, nobody's perfect", one of the more celebrated punchlines in film.

Another of his notable postwar roles was that of Cap'n Andy Hawks in MGM's 1951 remake of Show Boat, a role that he reprised onstage in the 1961 New York City Center revival of the musical and on tour. Brown performed several dance routines in the film, and famed choreographer Gower Champion appeared along with first wife Marge. Brown's final film appearance was in The Comedy of Terrors (1964).

Brown was a sports enthusiast, both in film and personally. Some of his best films were the "baseball trilogy" which consisted of Fireman, Save My Child (1932), Elmer, the Great (1933) and Alibi Ike (1935). He was a television and radio broadcaster for the New York Yankees in 1953. His son Joe L. Brown became the general manager of the Pittsburgh Pirates for more than 20 years. Brown spent Ty Cobb's last days with him, discussing his life.

Brown's sports enthusiasm also led to him becoming the first president of PONY Baseball and Softball (at the time named Pony League) when the organization was incorporated in 1953. He continued in the post until late 1964, when he retired. Later he traveled additional thousands of miles telling the story of PONY League, hoping to interest adults in organizing baseball programs for young people. He was a fan of thoroughbred horse racing, a regular at the racetracks in Del Mar and Santa Anita.

In popular culture
Brown was caricatured in the Disney cartoons Mickey's Gala Premiere (1933), Mother Goose Goes Hollywood (1938), and The Autograph Hound (1939); all contain a scene in which he is seen laughing so loud that his mouth opens extremely wide. According to the official biography Daws Butler: Characters Actor, Daws Butler used Joe E. Brown as inspiration for the voices of two Hanna-Barbera cartoon characters: Lippy the Lion (1962) and Peter Potamus (19631966).

He also starred in his own comic strip in the British comic Film Fun between 1933 and 1953.

Brown was an aviation enthusiast. Zack Mosley, creator of the popular comic strip The Adventures of Smilin' Jack, tributed Brown with the fictional lookalike character Flannelmouth Don; an air show announcer who did not need a microphone to be heard over the roar of multiple plane engines. The character appeared in the  strip from  the mid-1940s until the mid 1950s.

Later life and family
Brown married Kathryn Francis McGraw in 1915. The marriage lasted until his death in 1973. The couple had four children: two sons, Don Evan Brown (December 25, 1916  October 8, 1942; captain in the United States Army Air Force, who was killed in the crash of an A-20B Havoc bomber while serving as a ferry pilot) and Joe LeRoy "Joe L." Brown (September 1, 1918  August 15, 2010), and two daughters, Mary Katherine Ann (b. 1930) and Kathryn Francis (b. 1934). Both daughters were adopted as infants.

Joe L. Brown shared his father's love of baseball, serving as general manager of the Pittsburgh Pirates from 1955 to 1976, and briefly in 1985, also building the 1960 and 1971 World Series champions. Brown's '71 Pirates featured baseball's first all-black starting nine.

Death and legacy

Brown began having heart problems in 1968 after suffering a severe heart attack, and underwent cardiac surgery. He died from complications from arteriosclerosis on July 6, 1973 at his home in Brentwood, California, three weeks before his 82nd birthday. He is interred at Forest Lawn Memorial Park in Glendale, California.

For his contributions to the film industry, Brown was inducted into the Hollywood Walk of Fame in 1960 with a motion pictures star located at 1680 Vine Street.

In 1961, Bowling Green State University renamed the theatre in which Brown appeared in Harvey in the 1950s as the Joe E. Brown Theatre. It closed in 2011.

Holgate, Ohio, his birthplace, has a street named Joe E. Brown Avenue. Toledo, Ohio has a city park named Joe E. Brown Park at 150 West Oakland Street.

Rose Naftalin's popular 1975 cookbook includes a cookie named the Joe E. Brown. Brown was a frequent customer of Naftalin's Toledo restaurant.

Flatrock Brewing Company in Napoleon, Ohio offers several brown ales such as Joe E. Coffee And Vanilla Bean Brown Ale, Joe E. Brown Hazelnut, Chocolate Peanut Butter Joe E. Brown, Joe E Brown Chocolate Pumpkin, and Joe E. (Brown Ale).

Filmography

Crooks Can't Win (1928) as Jimmy Wells
Hit of the Show (1928) as Twisty
The Circus Kid (1928) as King Kruger
Take Me Home (1928) as Bunny
 Molly and Me (1929) as Jim Wilson
 My Lady's Past (1929) as Sam Young
On with the Show! (1929) as Joe Beaton
Painted Faces (1929) as Hermann / Beppo
Sally (1929) as Grand Duke Connie
Song of the West (1930) as Hasty
Hold Everything (1930) as Gink Schiner
Top Speed (1930) as Elmer Peters
Maybe It's Love (1930) as Yates
The Lottery Bride (1930) as Hoke
Going Wild (1930) as Rollo Smith
Sit Tight (1931) as Jojo
Broadminded (1931) as Ossie Simpson
Local Boy Makes Good (1931) as John Augustus Miller
Fireman, Save My Child (1932) as Joe Grant
The Tenderfoot (1932) as Calvin Jones
You Said a Mouthful (1932) as Joe Holt
Elmer, the Great (1933) as Elmer
Son of a Sailor (1933) as 'Handsome' Callahan
A Very Honorable Guy (1934) as 'Feet' Samuels
The Circus Clown (1934) as Happy Howard
6 Day Bike Rider (1934) as Wilfred Simpson
Alibi Ike (1935) as Frank X. Farrell
Bright Lights (1935) as Joe Wilson
A Midsummer Night's Dream (1935) as Flute, the Bellows-Mender
Sons o' Guns (1936) as Jimmy Canfield
Earthworm Tractors (1936) as Alexander Botts
Polo Joe (1936) as Joe Bolton
When's Your Birthday? (1937) as Dustin Willoughby
Riding on Air (1937) as Elmer Lane
Fit for a King (1937) as Virgil Ambrose Jeremiah Christopher 'Scoop' Jones
Wide Open Faces (1938) as Wilbur Meeks
The Gladiator (1938) as Hugo Kipp
Flirting with Fate (1938) as Dan Dixon
$1000 a Touchdown (1939) as Marlowe Mansfield Booth
Beware Spooks! (1939) as Roy L. Gifford
So You Won't Talk (1940) as Whiskers / 'Brute' Hanson
Shut My Big Mouth (1942) as Wellington Holmes
Joan of Ozark (1942) as Cliff Little
Daring Young Man (1942) as Jonathan Peckinpaw / Grandma Peckinpaw
Chatterbox (1943) as Rex Vane
Casanova in Burlesque (1944) as Joseph M. Kelly Jr.
Pin Up Girl  (1944) as Eddie Hall
Hollywood Canteen (1944) as Joe E. Brown
The Tender Years (1948) as Rev. Will Norris
Show Boat (1951) as Cap'n Andy Hawks
Around the World in 80 Days (1956) as the Fort Kearney stationmaster
Some Like It Hot (1959) as Osgood Fielding III
It's a Mad, Mad, Mad, Mad World (1963) as the union official giving a speech at a construction site
The Comedy of Terrors (1964) as the Cemetery Keeper

Television roles
The Buick Circus Hour, episode "Premiere Show" (1952) as The Clown
The Eddie Cantor Comedy Theatre, episode "The Practical Joker" (1955)
Schlitz Playhouse, episode "Meet Mr. Justice" (1955)
The Christophers, episodes "Washington as a Young Man" (1955) and "Basis of Law and Order" (1964) (final appearance)
Screen Directors Playhouse, episode "The Silent Partner" (1955) as Arthur Vail
The People's Choice, episode "Sox and the Proxy Marriage (1956) as Charles Hollister
General Electric Theater, episode "The Golden Key" (1956) as Earl Hall
General Electric Summer Originals, episode "The Joe E. Brown Show" (1956) as Joe Brown
The Ann Sothern Show, episode "Olive's Dream Man" (1960) as Mitchell Carson
Westinghouse Preview Theatre, episode "Five's a Family" (1961) as Harry Canover
Route 66, episode "Journey to Nineveh" (1962) as Sam Butler
The Greatest Show on Earth, episode "You're All Right, Ivy" (1964) as Diamond "Dimey" Vine

Books published
Your Kids and Mine (1944)  Your Kids and Mine was published as an Armed Services Edition during World War II.
Laughter Is a Wonderful Thing (1956)

References

External links

 
 
 
 
 Literature on Joe E. Brown
 Joe E. Brown Visits DePauw University; February 17, 1948

1891 births
1973 deaths
20th-century American comedians
20th-century American male actors
American male comedians
American male comedy actors
American male film actors
American male silent film actors
American male television actors
American people of Welsh descent
American stand-up comedians
Burials at Forest Lawn Memorial Park (Glendale)
Comedians from California
Comedians from Ohio
Major League Baseball broadcasters
Male actors from Toledo, Ohio
New York Yankees announcers
People from Brentwood, Los Angeles
People from Henry County, Ohio
Special Tony Award recipients
Vaudeville performers
Warner Bros. contract players
Deaths from arteriosclerosis